The Valluvan Kadav Sree Muthappan temple is situated in Kerala. In the Kannur district there are muthappan temples in every village. The most famous parassini kadav sree muthappan temple attracts thousands of pilgrims every day. The Valluvan Kadav Sree Muthappan Temple is a 400-year-old temple that was recently renovated completely, drawing large numbers of devotees to this temple situated in Kannadiparamba in Kannur district.

External links
Valluvan Kadavu Sree Muthappan Temple
Photos of Valluvan Kadavu Sree Muthappan
videos of Valluvan Kadavu Sree Muthappan Theyyam

Story of Muthappan
In Payyavoor village there was a Brahmin family known as Ayyankara. The lady of the Ayyankara royal family went for her usual bath in the nearby Payyvur river. As she was bathing, she heard a ringing sound, similar to the sound made by anklets. To her surprise she spotted a baby floating in a basket of flowers in the river water. Anxious for a child, she immediately took the boy home. Her husband considered the baby to be a blessing from their god Shiva. The child grew up. In his youth, he was fond of hunting and he would often kill birds and animals and would consume their roasted flesh. This practice was highly unacceptable in the eyes of his parents, for which the boy would often receive scolding. Unable to bear this, one day the boy decided to leave home. On seeing that his mother was reluctant to let him leave, he looked at her in fury with fiery eyes. On seeing this terrible expression of her son, she bowed to him and understood that her son was no ordinary boy. Thus, his divinity was revealed and he was thus understood to be Muthappan.

He obeyed that he would wear the "Poikannu" to conceal the original as that eye may make fire in order to create "Santi and Samabavana" Muthappan at his childhood was always for the benefit of downtrodden and poor people. The mother knew that he is godly gift and leave Ayyankara. He left Ayyankara and reached Kunnathurpadi, Puralimala, Thillenkeri, Kannapuram, Parassinikadavu and Valluvankadav. In Kunnathurpadi, Chantan a tribalman was his friend. He wanter always with his dog., He saw Chantan was tapping from Palm tree. The boy requested to give him toddy. But Chantan ignored it. All of sudden he transformed into a stone. His wife prayed that she would offer the boy "oottu" and "Tiruvappana" and "amruthakalasam" in the month of Dhanu. Suddenly Chantan appeared. Therefore, the Chantan family started to do the pooja for the boy and started to call "Muthappan". In the Kunnathurpadi royal family called karakatttidam nayanar learned this and invited Muthappan. Henceforth Muthappan pooja started. The god started his travel once again.

Every year in the month of Dhanu the festival in Kunnathur starts with Muthappan performance dressed by "Anhuttan" famil member. The vellattam komaram also accompany them.

The Muthappan form in different way. The first tone in the form of boy, youg boy. Purankala Muthappan and finally Thiryvapan, which is now seen at Prassinikadav and Valluvankadavu.

The Muthappankavu and muthappan Madapuras are plenty in North Malabar. The Madppuras areas are blessed with rich growth of vegetation which provides setting for cool and calm atmosphere. All the Madappura are nearby rivers or hill top surrounded by different communities associated with Muthappan. The Vannan and anthuttan community is the most powerful theyyam artists. They are the traditional Muthappan artists. In theyyam, Thira season they are all busy with the Madapura festival.

Story of Valluvan Kadavu Muthappan Madappura
Origin of Valluvankadavu Madappura can be traced to a vision that Muthappan gave to a devotee who lived in Valluvankadavu centuries ago. This devotee was Karanavar (eldest man who is the family head) of an influential local family named Puthiya Valappil. This family owned many landed properties in Valluvankadavu as well as in other villages. Due to income from agriculture, they were extremely affluent.

This Karanavar, despite his immense wealth, was a hardworking farmer. Being devout, he was punctual with his prayers and rituals that he practiced on a daily basis. He was also a generous and charitable person. He always ensured that poor people in his village received grain from his private granaries during famines and lean months. Due to that, he was immensely popular with people of his village. Despite his wealth, he was always a modest person.

Once, during twilight, after he had his bath and prayers, he was strolling in the front-yard of his house. Then as if directed by an unseen power, he walked towards the river bank. He stood on the shore for a while watching the river flow. It was dark by then. Then suddenly an unusually bright source of light appeared on the surface of river. This was followed by a figure – shrouded in smoke- appearing on the river surface.

The saintly Karanavar was overwhelmed by what he saw. He felt a joy that he never felt before in his life. He looked carefully at this figure and bowed respectfully to him. Then he realized – on the basis of the figure’s appearance – that this figure was none other than Muthappan himself! Due to extreme joy, he tried to walk through water towards the divine figure– but an unknown force flung him back to the shore and he fell unconscious. When he regained consciousness, Muthappan had vanished – but the Karanavar started to wander in that river shore in search of Muthappan. He was also loudly chanting names of God as he wandered.

Then he realized that the Muthappan had disappeared. But he was still in a state of supreme bliss. He rushed back to his house. His family members were scared to see him in a state of extreme bliss – contrary to his usual composed self. He then headed straight to sanctum sanctorum of the house. He then prepared for a Painkutti, prepared favorite Nivedyam of Muthappan and fell in prostration before Muthappan. He prayed loudly totally unaware of his surroundings. Then he fell once more into unconsciousness. His family members who were unaware of what happened felt extremely worried at his behavior.

As he lay unconscious, Muthappan appeared him in his dream and spoke thus – “You have seen me. And know that I will be always with you.” Then he regained consciousness. He then spent the rest of the night chanting names of Muthappan.

He was a changed man after he got vision of Muthappan. He became more radiant than before and spent more time in prayer and ritual. He regularly conducted Painkutti for Muthappan at his house. He also ensured divine favor by regular conduct of Vellattam at his residence. Then as per revelations in an astrological consultation, worship of Edalapurath Chamundi was done at Kottilakam of the house as well as worship of Gulikan as Upadevan. Karanavar became known as Guru.

Due to veneration of Muthappan, entire village got blessed and changed for better – there were no more floods and epidemics in the village. Unprecedented contentment and prosperity appeared in the area. People from distant lands flocked to seek blessings of Muthappan here. Guru conducted all the rites and rituals as Madayan until his death.

After his death, his successors continued his rites and rituals as per prescription. But in course of time, there was steady increase in failure to conduct rituals – culminating in total abandonment of the site as seat of Muthappan. It showed its effect by a host of evils befalling the family and village in various ways. But divine presence of Muthappan remained intact in this site – as attested by various astrological analysis and experience of local devotees. Then as if by will of Muthappan and the Guru, a descendant of Guru took charge of this holy site.

Then, as atonement for sins, consecration was done after building a Gurusthanam and Madappura. Valluvankadavu Muthappan Trust was established under leadership of Ariyambatt Mukundan. Trust had been successful in revival of Valluvankadavu as a centre of veneration of Muthappan. Today, pilgrims come from distant areas regularly. At present, Valluvankadavu Muthappan Madappura can rival any major temple of Kerala as sacred site.

Valluvankadavu Muthappan Madappura is located in Kannadiparamba village of Kannur district on the banks of Valapattanam River.The Temple is open to devotees of all religions and castes. In addition of Lord Muthappan, devotees are also blessed by divinities like Guru, Edalapurath Chamundi, Gulikan and Nagam. Devotees must first pray and circumambulate Gulikan and Nagam and then pray to Edalapurath Chamundi. Only then must they proceed to pray to Muthappan. Temple will be open on all days from 5 am to 10 am and 4.30 pm to 8.30 pm. Ottu and Vellattam will be conducted on all Sundays. Thiruvappana and Vellattam on all first Sunday and Monday of each month. Thiruvappana Mahotsavam will be conducted from January 1 to January 7. A dining hall with the capacity for five hundred persons is attached to temple. Sarasvati Mandapam hall for functions like marriages. As a part of humanitarian service, temple has been distributing Ayurveda medicines and treatment in collaboration with local Ayurveda hospital to local people and pilgrims free of cost.
Thousands avail the benefit of free treatment given on Sundays. There is also a welfare center with all modern facilities attached to temple.

See also
 Temples of Kerala

Hindu temples in Kannur district